Ubaldi is a surname. Notable people with the name include:

Martín Félix Ubaldi (born 1969), Argentine former football striker
Pietro Ubaldi (1886–1972), Italian author, teacher and philosopher

See also
Baldo degli Ubaldi, is a station on Line A of the Rome Metro
Baldus de Ubaldis (1327–1400), Italian jurist